Sybra okinawana is a species of beetle in the family Cerambycidae. It was described by Breuning and Ohbayashi in 1970.

References

okinawana
Beetles described in 1970